Church of Epiphany or Epiphany Church is a United Protestant church in Lucknow, India, that was built in 1877 in Gothic Revival style. Originally a Church of India, Burma and Ceylon parish, it was erected to address the needs of the growing Anglican community in the region. Before the construction of this church, there were two Anglican churches in the city. The church has a red-brick facade with many turrets, and an imposing five-storey front tower.

The Epiphany Church comes under the Diocese of Lucknow in the Church of North India. Rev. E.F. Bakhsh serves as the current Presbyter In-charge. Rev. J.W Adams, Rev. Iqbal Masih, Rev. R. Raymand Paul and Rev. R. Singh have also served as presbyters in the church.

References

Bibliography

External links
Epiphany Church, Lucknow profile

Churches in Lucknow
Church of North India church buildings
1877 establishments in India
Religious buildings and structures completed in 1877
Tourist attractions in Lucknow
Buildings and structures in Lucknow
Christianity in Uttar Pradesh
Gothic Revival church buildings in India